Gambhirgad Fort   is a fort located 58 km from Dahanu, Palghar district, of Maharashtra. This fort is less important fort in Palghar district. The fort is in ruins and restoration is to be done.

History
Gambhirgad Fort was part of Jawhar State. When Jayabha Mukne became sole master of Jawhar, He gave the gambhirgad fort to a Warli chief. Latter it was owned by Jawhar State government.

How to reach
The nearest town is Khanvel which is 20 km from District Silvassa. And second  Kasa which is 26 km from Dahanu. The base village of the fort is Patilpada which is 32 km from Kasa. There are good hotels at Kasa, now tea and snacks are also available in small hotels at Saiwan. The trekking path starts from the hillock south of the Patilpada. The route is medium level but safe and wide. There are no trees on the trekking route. It takes about 2.5 to 3 Hours to reach the entrance gate of the fort.

Places to see
There are water cisterns, small temple and a bastion on the fort. It takes about an hour to visit all places on the fort.

See also 
 List of forts in Maharashtra
 List of forts in India
 Marathi People
 List of Maratha dynasties and states
 Maratha War of Independence
 Battles involving the Maratha Empire
 Maratha Army
 Maratha titles
 Military history of India
 List of people involved in the Maratha Empire

References 

Buildings and structures of the Maratha Empire
16th-century forts in India
Buildings and structures in Maharashtra
Tourist attractions in Pune district
Former populated places in India
Hiking trails in India